He Lei (born June 1955) is a lieutenant general of the Chinese People's Liberation Army.

Biography
He was born in Luoyang, Henan, in June 1955, to a military family, while his ancestral home in Tongjiang County, Sichuan Province. He enlisted in the People's Liberation Army in 1968, when he served in the military in Beijing Military Region. At the end of 1990, he was transferred to the PLA Academy of Military Science, the PLA's highest-level research institute and center of military science. In July 2013 he was appointed deputy commander of the Lanzhou Military Region. Five months later, he became vice-president of the PLA Academy of Military Science.

He was promoted to the rank of major general (shaojiang) in July 2009 and lieutenant general (zhongjiang) in July 2014.

He was a delegate to the 13th National People's Congress and a delegate to 19th National Congress of the Communist Party of China.

References

1955 births
PLA National Defence University alumni
Central Party School of the Chinese Communist Party alumni
Living people
People's Liberation Army generals from Henan
Politicians from Luoyang
Chinese Communist Party politicians from Henan
People's Republic of China politicians from Henan